Dan Martin is a 20th and 21st century American cartoonist.

Martin, a St. Louis native, was graduated from Lindbergh High School. At age 16, He worked at Six Flags Over Mid-America as caricaturist. He joined the St. Louis Post-Dispatch in 1980 out of the University of Kansas.

Martin draws the Weatherbird for the Post-Dispatch. He is the sixth cartoonist to draw the Weatherbird, which debuted in 1901 and appears every day on the paper's front page. He is the second longest serving Weatherbird artist (after Amadee Wohlschlaeger), having taken over the strip in 1986. "Albert Schweitzer, who was drawing the Bird at the time, told me he was planning to retire" Martin recalls. "After I had practiced for about a year, we took 10 Weatherbird drawings of mine mixed in with 10 of Albert’s and showed them to editor Bill Woo, who couldn’t tell the difference... So I got the job."

In 1987, Martin eliminated the cigar which had been emblematic of the character since its inception, He also restored the bird's beak to some degree (previous Weatherbird cartoonists had atrophied the beak to the point of a flat-faced Weatherbird).

Martin also draws the weekly cartoon "Postcard From Mound City" for the Post-Dispatch editorial page ("Mound City" is a nickname for St. Louis, based on the nearby Cahokia Mounds).

Publications

References

External links
 Lambiek Comiclopedia biography.

Living people
St. Louis Post-Dispatch people
American comics artists
American comic strip cartoonists
University of Kansas alumni
Year of birth missing (living people)